Souk De la Commission is one of the souks of the medina of Tunis.

Etymology 

The souk got its name from the International Finance Committee headquarters that was in 1869 in charge of managing the debt of the Tunisian regency before the French occupation in 1881.

Location 

The souk can be reached from Souk Sidi Boumendil. It leads to the victory square where Bab Bhar (one of the gates of the medina) is located.

Products 
It is specialized in selling products imported from China and eastern Asia.

Notes and references 

Commission